Indo-Chinese may refer to:

 China–India relations
 Indo-Chinese cuisine
 Indochinese, of or pertaining to Indochina
 Indonesian Chinese

See also
 Chinese Indian (disambiguation)
 Sino-Indian skirmish (disambiguation)